Sabin Nsanzimana is a  Minister of Health in the Government of Rwanda. He was a  former Director General of Rwanda Biomedical Centre (RBC).

References 

Living people
Health ministers of Rwanda
Year of birth missing (living people)